The Vietnamese pheasant, or Vietnam fireback, was formerly considered a species of gallopheasant, Lophura hatinhensis, but is now considered a variant of Edward's pheasant. Discovered in 1964, it is endemic to central Vietnam. Its range concentrates around Kẻ Gỗ Nature Reserve in Hà Tĩnh Province.

Habitat
The fireback inhabits primary and secondary (including logged) evergreen forest in lowlands and hills from sea level (at least historically) to about 300 m. It may tolerate habitat degradation, but is apparently far more common in closed-canopy forest, and has been trapped in dense, streamside vegetation.

References

Gallopheasants
Endemic birds of Vietnam
Endangered animals
Endangered biota of Asia
Controversial bird taxa
Hà Tĩnh province

it:Lophura hatinhensis